Hypsilurus magnus is a species of agama found in Indonesia and Papua New Guinea.

References

Hypsilurus
Reptiles described in 2006
Taxa named by Ulrich Manthey
Taxa named by Wolfgang Denzer
Agamid lizards of New Guinea